Yes Boss may refer to:
Yes Boss (film), 1997 Bollywood film
Yes Boss (TV series), Indian situation comedy
Yes Boss (band), British rap duo